Abdullah Al-Buraiki (born 12 August 1987) is a Kuwaiti footballer.

International career

International goals
Scores and results list Kuwait's goal tally first.

References

1987 births
Living people
Kuwaiti footballers
2015 AFC Asian Cup players
Sportspeople from Kuwait City
Association football midfielders
AFC Cup winning players
Kuwait international footballers
Al Salmiya SC players
Kuwait Premier League players
Kuwait SC players
Kuwaiti expatriate footballers
Expatriate footballers in Oman
Kuwaiti expatriate sportspeople in Oman